Napolitano (Modern Italian "Napoletano", Neapolitan: Nnapulitano) is translated in English as Neapolitan. The word can refer to people from Napoli (Naples), their language, culture in addition to being an Italian surname.

People with the surname:

 Andrew Napolitano (b. 1950), a former Superior Court judge and former legal analyst for Fox News Channel
 Angelina Napolitano  (1882–1932), the first person in Canada to use the battered woman defense for murder
 Antonio Napolitano (1928–2014), an Italian film critic
 Art Napolitano (b. 1956), an American soccer player
 Danilo Napolitano (b. 1981), an Italian cyclist
 Dominic "Sonny Black" Napolitano (1930–1981), a capo in the Bonanno crime family
 George Napolitano, a photographer
 Gian Gaspare Napolitano (1907–1966), an Italian journalist, screenwriter and film director
 Giorgio Napolitano (b. 1925), former President of the Italian Republic
 Grace Napolitano (b. 1936), an American politician, a Democratic member of the United States House of Representatives
 Janet Napolitano (b. 1957), former U.S. Secretary of Homeland Security, Arizona Governor, President of the University of California
 Joe Napolitano (1948–2016), an American film and television director
 Johnette Napolitano (b. 1957), an American musician, the lead singer and songwriter and bassist of Concrete Blonde
 Luca Napolitano (b. 1986), an Italian songwriter
 Luigi G. Napolitano Award, a prize awarded by IAF
 Mario Napolitano (1910–1995), an Italian chess player
 Michael Napolitano, the Mayor of Cranston, Rhode Island
 Nicola Napolitano, multiple people
 Nicola Napolitano (b. 1983), an Italian footballer
 Nicola Napolitano (1838–1863), Italian brigand
 Norberto Napolitano, known by the pseudonym Pappo (1950–2005), an Argentine blues and rock musician
 Paolo Maria Napolitano (1944–2016), Italian judge
 Peter Napolitano, known by his pseudonym Produce Pete (b. 1945), an American grocer, food writer, and television personality
 Raimundo Napolitano, an Italian painter of the Renaissance period
 Richard A. Napolitano (1916–1988), former Illinois state Representative
 Stefano Napolitano (b. 1995), Italian tennis player

See also 
 Napoletano
 Napolitan

Italian words and phrases
Archaic words and phrases
Italian-language surnames
Italian toponymic surnames
Jewish surnames
Culture in Naples